The following is a list of Nippon Professional Baseball players with the last name starting with H, retired or active.

H

References

External links
Japanese Baseball

 H